is a role-playing video game developed by Advance Communications and published by M&M for the Famicom on 1991.  is a remake of the Famicom version for the PC Engine Super CD-ROM by Pack-In-Video in December 1993–which featured updated graphics. Neither version was released outside of Japan. An OVA adaptation of this was also released in Japan on 1994.

The game combines science fiction and comedy. In it, an unnamed hero arrives in the city where women stole the rights of men. The player controls a man as he tries to free other men around the city. Otaku no Seiza features turn-based battles, similar to those of the Dragon Quest series.

Gameplay
Otaku no Seiza features standard role-playing video gameplay. Players control a party of characters through overhead environments, including towns, dungeons, and a world map. While on the world map or in a dungeon, the party will randomly encounter enemies. The perspective switches to a first-person mode and the enemies and party members take turns attacking or healing.

Plot
Otaku no Seiza tells the story of Fuyuu City, a place built in space far in the future. Aurora, a group of five attractive and powerful women, control the city. Men in the city are treated poorly compared to women, until the protagonist finds himself in the middle of the city with amnesia. Outraged, the protagonist decides to defeat Aurora and gain rights for the oppressed men of the city.

External links
 Otaku no Seiza and Aurora Quest at GameFAQs
 Aurora Quest at MobyGames
 

1991 video games
1994 anime OVAs
Japan-exclusive video games
Nintendo Entertainment System games
Polestar games
Role-playing video games
Science fiction video games
TurboGrafx-CD games
Video games developed in Japan